Cryptanthus zonatus is a plant species in the genus Cryptanthus. This species is endemic to Brazil.

Cultivars
 Cryptanthus 'Blushing Zebra'
 Cryptanthus 'Cochleatus'
 Cryptanthus 'Green Edge Kay'
 Cryptanthus 'Koning'
 Cryptanthus 'Nivea'
 Cryptanthus 'Pie Crust'
 Cryptanthus 'Salamanca'
 Cryptanthus 'Zebrinus'

References

BSI Cultivar Registry Retrieved 11 October 2009

zonatus
Flora of Brazil